The 1975–76 Primeira Divisão was the 42nd season of top-tier football in Portugal.

Overview
It was contested by 16 teams, and S.L. Benfica won the championship.

League standings

Results

Season statistics

Top goalscorers

References

External links
 Portugal 1975-76 - RSSSF (Jorge Miguel Teixeira)
 Portuguese League 1975/76 - footballzz.co.uk
 Portugal - Table of Honor - Soccer Library 

Primeira Liga seasons
1
Portugal